Gero Bisanz (3 November 1935 – 17 October 2014) was a German football player and coach.

Career
Bisanz played for 1. FC Köln and Viktoria Köln.

From 1982 to 1996, he was the coach of the Germany women's national team, in that time winning the UEFA Women's Championship three times, in 1989, 1991 and 1995. He also was leading director of the German Football Association's coaches training facilities from 1971 to 2000, then being followed by Erich Rutemöller. He also coached 1. FC Köln (amateurs), Bayer Leverkusen, TuS Lindlar and Germany B.

References

1935 births
German football managers
German footballers
Germany women's national football team managers
1991 FIFA Women's World Cup managers
1995 FIFA Women's World Cup managers
Bayer 04 Leverkusen managers
2014 deaths
FC Viktoria Köln players
Association football midfielders
UEFA Women's Championship-winning managers